Erythrotriorchis is a genus of bird of prey in the family Accipitridae. 
It contains the following species:
 Chestnut-shouldered goshawk (Erythrotriorchis buergersi)
 Red goshawk (Erythrotriorchis radiatus)

Etymology
"Erythro-" is from a Greek word for "red", and "triorchis" meant a kind of hawk thought to have three testicles.  For further details see Eutriorchis.

Taxonomy
Latham described the red goshawk as Falco radiatus in 1801. Sharpe defined Erythrotriorchis in 1875 as a new monotypic genus for Falco radiatus.

Peters also included E. doriae in the genus, though Doria's goshawk is now classified separately as Megatriorchis doriae.

References 

 
Bird genera
Taxonomy articles created by Polbot